Caroline Asiimwe is an Ugandan veterinary and environment conservation leader and researcher. She engages the local population in a cooperative approach to preserve wildlife from illegal activities and ensure healthy ecosystems in Uganda.

In 2017, Asiimwe was named  a TWAS-Samira Omar Prize winner for Innovation for Sustainability Prize. The Innovation for Sustainability Prize is awarded to scientists for their contribution in a multidisciplinary area directly relevant to the science of sustainability.

Early life and career 
Asiimwe holds a master's degree in veterinary science at the University of Edinburgh in Scotland. Assimwe has been working as a veterinary and conservation coordinator in hand with carrying out research on the management of natural resources at the Budongo Conservation Field Station in Uganda for 7 years

She as engages ex-poachers of animals in activities as eco-guards. Caroline collects data to ensure sustainable conservation of Ugandan resources. She attended Makerere University in Uganda's capital city.

Her research work includes: Maternal cannibalism in two populations of wild chimpanzees(2019), Impact of Snare Injuries on Parasite Prevalence in Wild Chimpanzees (Pan troglodytes),(2016),Cars kill chimpanzees: case report of a wild chimpanzee killed on a road at Bulindi, Uganda(2016), Programme level implementation of malaria rapid diagnostic tests (RDTs) use: outcomes and cost of training health workers at lower level health care facilities in Uganda(2012).

References 

Living people
Year of birth missing (living people) 
Makerere University alumni
Ugandan veterinarians